Milagiriya Grama Niladhari Division is a Grama Niladhari Division of the Thimbirigasyaya Divisional Secretariat of Colombo District of Western Province, Sri Lanka.

Kirilapone North, Visakha Vidyalaya, Bambalapitiya, Milagiriya, Majestic City, Bodu Bala Sena, Dutch Burgher Union of Ceylon, Sirimavo Bandaranaike Vidyalaya, Saifee Villa and E FM are located within, nearby or associated with Milagiriya.

Milagiriya is a surrounded by the Bambalapitiya, Kurunduwatta, Thimbirigasyaya and Havelock Town Grama Niladhari Divisions.

Demographics

Ethnicity 

The Milagiriya Grama Niladhari Division has a Sinhalese plurality (43.9%), a significant Sri Lankan Tamil population (32.5%) and a significant Moor population (15.6%). In comparison, the Thimbirigasyaya Divisional Secretariat (which contains the Milagiriya Grama Niladhari Division) has a Sinhalese majority (52.8%), a significant Sri Lankan Tamil population (28.0%) and a significant Moor population (15.1%)

Religion 

The Milagiriya Grama Niladhari Division has a Buddhist plurality (36.0%), a significant Hindu population (30.6%), a significant Muslim population (17.6%) and a significant Roman Catholic population (10.5%). In comparison, the Thimbirigasyaya Divisional Secretariat (which contains the Milagiriya Grama Niladhari Division) has a Buddhist plurality (47.9%), a significant Hindu population (22.5%) and a significant Muslim population (17.4%)

Gallery

References 

Grama Niladhari Divisions of Thimbirigasyaya Divisional Secretariat